Ariel Silvio Zárate Riga (born 13 July 1973) is an Argentine former professional footballer who played mainly as an attacking midfielder, and a manager.

Only having made his debut in the Primera División in his own country well past his 30s, he spent the vast majority of his professional career in Spain, mainly with Málaga which he represented in three full La Liga seasons.

Career
After completing his formation at Club Atlético Vélez Sarsfield, Buenos Aires-born Zárate began playing professionally in Mexico with Club Toluca. He then had a stint with lowly A.S.D. Riccione 1929 of Italy and spent seven years in Spain, with Cádiz CF, Málaga CF (helping the Andalusia team achieve promotion to La Liga in 1999), Elche CF and Xerez CD.

Subsequently, Zárate returned to Argentina, playing for modest clubs Deportivo Morón, C.S.D. Tristán Suárez and All Boys. He helped the latter to the Primera B Metropolitana championship in his first season.

As All Boys returned to the Primera División in 2010 after an absence of nearly 40 years, Zárate made his debut in the competition in a 0–1 home loss against Racing Club de Avellaneda for the campaign's Apertura, aged 37 years and 25 days. Following his retirement, he acted as their general manager.

Personal life
Zárate's son luca debuted in admiral Brown yesterday and "el chino " had three brothers, all footballers: younger Rolando and Mauro and older Sergio, with all of them eventually representing the Argentina national team. Ariel's nephew, Tobías, also became a professional footballer.

References

External links

1973 births
Living people
Argentine sportspeople of Chilean descent
Argentine people of Calabrian descent
Footballers from Buenos Aires
Argentine footballers
Association football midfielders
Argentine Primera División players
Primera Nacional players
Deportivo Morón footballers
All Boys footballers
Liga MX players
Deportivo Toluca F.C. players
A.S.D. Riccione 1929 players
La Liga players
Segunda División players
Segunda División B players
Cádiz CF players
Málaga CF players
Elche CF players
Xerez CD footballers
Argentine football managers
Argentine expatriate footballers
Expatriate footballers in Mexico
Expatriate footballers in Italy
Expatriate footballers in Spain
Argentine expatriate sportspeople in Spain
Zárate family